The Ligue de Football de la Guyane (English: Guyana Football League) is the governing body of football in French Guiana. Since 2013, it has been a member of CONCACAF. However, it is not a member of FIFA.

See also
French Guiana Championnat National
French Guiana national football team

External Links

French Guiana at CONCACAF website

References

French Guiana
Football in French Guiana
Association football governing bodies in South America
Guy
Sports organizations established in 1962
1962 establishments in French Guiana